Tobias Hage (born August 18, 1991) is a Swedish ice hockey player. He is currently playing with Djurgårdens IF Hockey of the Swedish Hockey League (SHL).

Hage made his Swedish Hockey League debut playing with Djurgårdens IF Hockey during the 2014–15 SHL season.

References

External links

1991 births
Living people
Djurgårdens IF Hockey players
Swedish ice hockey forwards
Tierps HK players
Ice hockey people from Stockholm